Heron Dam is a storage dam Rio Arriba County, in northern New Mexico in the southwestern United States, just north of the El Vado Dam.  It is owned and operated by the United States Bureau of Reclamation.
The dam is about 9 miles west of the town of Tierra Amarilla.

Construction

The dam was built as part of the San Juan-Chama Project, which transfers water from the San Juan River basin through the  Azotea Tunnel under the Continental Divide into Willow Creek, where it is stored in Heron Reservoir as part of the Colorado River Storage Project.
The dam is located on Willow Creek near the creek's confluence with the Rio Chama.
Construction was completed in 1971.
The outlet works at El Vado Dam, just downstream from Heron Dam, were enlarged as part of the San Juan-Chama Project so releases from Heron Reservoir could pass unimpeded through the dam.

Structure

Heron Dike, one mile northwest of the dam, helps contain the reservoir. The dam's outlet works include an intake structure,  diameter concrete-lined upstream tunnel, gate chamber,  modified horseshoe concrete-lined downstream tunnel, and a stilling basin.

Operations

The dam was built strictly for storage and delivery of San Juan-Chama Project water for municipal, domestic, industrial, recreation, irrigation, and fish and wildlife purposes.
The water is diverted to New Mexico as agreed under the Colorado River and Upper Colorado River Compacts.
The amount of water diverted each year, and the way in which it is used, are subject to well-defined agreements.
Flows of "native" or "natural" water from Willow Creek and from the Rio Chama upstream of the dam are measured and bypassed through the reservoir.

There is no carry-over provision: contractors must take delivery of their water by December 31. 
This means that contractors such as the City of Albuquerque or the Middle Rio Grande Conservancy District often withdraw their water and arrange to store it in downstream reservoirs such as El Vado, Abiquiu, Jemez Canyon (by exchange), and Elephant Butte.

References
Citations

Sources

Dams in New Mexico
Dams in the Rio Grande basin
Buildings and structures in Rio Arriba County, New Mexico
Dams completed in 1971
United States Bureau of Reclamation dams
United States local public utility dams
1971 establishments in New Mexico